Oysterhead is an American rock supergroup featuring bassist Les Claypool of Primus, guitarist Trey Anastasio of Phish and drummer Stewart Copeland of The Police, with both Claypool and Anastasio providing vocals.  The band's eclectic sound has been described as "alt-funk fusion".

In April 2000 Superfly Presents asked Claypool to assemble a band to perform during New Orleans Jazz Fest. Claypool contacted Anastasio and together they agreed on mutual hero, Copeland. Oysterhead was originally intended to be a singular live performance at New Orleans Saenger Theatre on May 4, 2000. The band compiled a set of almost entirely original material for the show, practicing at Muskegon's Frauenthal Theatre. Tickets were scalped for up to $2,000 each, audience members included Francis Ford Coppola and Matt Groening. The band toured in 2001 and was scheduled to tour in 2020. Both times it has toured it has been interrupted due to significant disasters, in 2001 due to the September 11 attacks and in 2020 due to the COVID-19 pandemic. Oysterhead played at The Peach Music Festival in Scranton, PA in July 2021.

The Grand Pecking Order
In 2001, Oysterhead reformed to record and release an album entitled The Grand Pecking Order, which featured nine new tracks in addition to four songs originally debuted in New Orleans. The album was released on October 2, 2001, and was supported by a North American tour, spanning from October 21 to November 18, 2001, accompanied by North Mississippi Allstars, Drums & Tuba, The Cancer Conspiracy, Lake Trout, Mark Ribot y Los Cubanos Postizos and New Orleans Klezmer Allstars. Two pre-tour warm-up shows had been booked at Toad's Place in New Haven, Connecticut for September 14, 2001 and the Irving Plaza in New York City, New York (as part of CMJ Music Marathon) for September 15, 2001, but were cancelled in the wake of the September 11 attacks. Oysterhead's 2001 tour saw the debut of the Matterhorn, a guitar played by Trey Anastasio featuring a full-size deer antler. On November 15, 2001, the band performed the song "Oz Is Ever Floating" on Late Night with Conan O'Brien.

Reformation at Bonnaroo
On June 16, 2006, Oysterhead reunited to perform a two-hour set at the Bonnaroo Music Festival. The band performed music from The Grand Pecking Order during the set.

Reformation in 2019
On October 14, 2019, Oysterhead created social media accounts on Instagram and Twitter sparking debate about their reunion. On October 15, Oysterhead announced two shows on February 14 and 15, 2020 at 1stBank Center in Broomfield, Colorado.  Oysterhead will be headlining the SweetWater 420 Fest in Atlanta, Georgia.  On December 6, Oysterhead announced they were headlining the 2020 Peach Music Festival in Scranton, Pennsylvania. On December 17, they announced two shows in the Bay Area. They were scheduled to perform in Berkeley, California on April 17, 2020; and Stanford, California on April 18, 2020 as well as Bonnaroo Music Festival on June 13, 2020.

The Broomfield, Colorado shows featured 2 sets of music featuring songs from The Grand Pecking Order and various covers from individual careers.  The setlists varied in terms of song placement, improvisation and chosen covers. The shows were met with high praise from those in attendance.

Aside from the performance in Broomfield, the entire reunion for 2020 was disrupted by the COVID-19 pandemic, and Oysterhead continued to tour through 2021.

When asked in March 2022 if there were plans for a second Oysterhead album, bassist Les Claypool said, "You know, we always talk about it when we're sitting around, but all three of us are so busy. We haven't really found the time to do it. It's an undertaking. You've got three guys that are all alpha dogs in the same room. It's more of an undertaking I think, but who knows. I've been talking to Stewart lately about trying to get together and just start jamming on some shit and see what happens."

List of performances

Discography

The Grand Pecking Order (2001)
2020/02/14 Broomfield, CO (2020) (Live album) 
2020/02/15 Broomfield, CO (2020) (Live album)

References

External links
Oysterhead's official website

American alternative rock groups
Jam bands
Rock music supergroups
Neo-psychedelia groups
American musical trios
Musical groups established in 2000
Les Claypool